The GM Omega platform is a vehicle architecture designed by General Motors for full-size, rear-wheel and all-wheel drive luxury vehicles. The platform architecture was developed for Cadillac, and subsequently debuted in the all-new 2016 Cadillac CT6 sedan.

Vehicle applications

Production vehicle applications 
 2016-2020 Cadillac CT6

Concept vehicle applications 
 2015 Buick Avenir Concept

References 
 General Motors Company. Cadillac Motor Division. Cadillac Extends the Top of Its Range with CT6. GM News. General Motors, 31 Mar. 2015. Web. 13 Sept. 2015.
 Unknown. "GM Omega Vehicle Platform." GM Authority. GM Authority, 2015. Web. 13 Sept. 2015.

Omega